Breynia vitis-idaea, the officinal breynia, is a perennial tree-like species of Phyllanthaceae (Euphorbiaceae s.l.), found from India east to Taiwan and Okinawa and south to Indonesia. It is a shrub or treelet with egg-shaped leaves that can reach up to 3 m tall.  It has staminate flowers and spherical, red fruit.

Breynia vitis-idaea is pollinated by the leafflower moth Epicephala vitisidaea in Fujian, China and the Ryukyu Archipelago, Japan. The moth actively pollinates the flowers, but lays an egg into the space between the external carpel wall and the tepals. The moth caterpillars consume a subset of the tree's seeds, receiving nourishment in return.

It contains the saponin breynin and terpenic and phenolic glycosides.  It is marketed in Taiwan as Chi R Yun.

Toxicity
Breynia vitis-idaea poisoning causes hepatocellular liver injury.

Other names
Breynia officinalis Hemsley and B. officinalis var. accrescens (Hayata) M.J.Deng & J.C.Wang are synonyms of B. vitis-idaea.

Other variants include:
Breynia formosana (Hayata) Hayata
Breynia officinalis Hemsley var. officinalis
Breynia stipitata Muell. -Arg. var. formosana Hayata
Breynia stipitata Muell. -Arg. var. formosana Hayata

Other common names in English include:
Formosan breynia
Large calyx breynia
Medicinal breynia

Common names in other languages include:

, ดับพิษ (northern), ก้างปลาทะเล, ผักหวานตัวผู้  (central)

References

External links
Photograph of B. officinalis Hemsl.

vitisidaea
Flora of Asia
Plants described in 1768
Plants used in traditional Chinese medicine
Taxa named by Nicolaas Laurens Burman